The seventh season of The Bachelor premiered on 31 July 2019. This season features Matt Agnew, a 31-year-old astrophysicist from Melbourne, Victoria, courting 28 women.

Contestants
The season began with 20 contestants. In episode 2, eight "intruders" were brought into the competition, bringing the total number of contestants to 28.

Call-out order

 The contestant received the golden ticket, a guaranteed date in Matt's hometown, along with a rose.
 The contestant received a rose during a date.
 The contestant received a rose outside of a date or the rose ceremony.
 The contestant was eliminated.
 The contestant was eliminated outside the rose ceremony.
 The contestant was eliminated during a date.
 The contestant quit the competition.
 The contestant won the competition.

Notes

Episodes

Episode 1
Original airdate: 31 July 2019

Episode 2
Original airdate: 1 August 2019

Episode 3
Original airdate: 7 August 2019

Episode 4
Original airdate: 8 August 2019

Episode 5
Original airdate: 14 August 2019

Episode 6
Original airdate: 15 August 2019

Episode 7
Original airdate: 21 August 2019

Episode 8
Original airdate: 22 August 2019

Episode 9
Original airdate: 28 August 2019

Episode 10
Original airdate: 29 August 2019

Episode 11
Original airdate: 4 September 2019

Episode 12
Original airdate: 5 September 2019

Episode 13
Original airdate: 11 September 2019

Episode 14
Original airdate: 12 September 2019

Episode 15
Original airdate: 18 September 2019

Episode 16
Original airdate: 19 September 2019

Ratings

References

2019 Australian television seasons
Australian (season 07)
Television shows filmed in Australia
Television shows filmed in South Africa